Holten is a railway station located in Holten, Netherlands. The station was opened on 1 September 1888 and is located on the Deventer–Almelo railway. It closed on 15 May 1938, but reopened on 1 June 1940. The train services are operated by Nederlandse Spoorwegen.

Train services

Bus services

References

External links
NS website 
Dutch Public Transport journey planner 

Railway stations in Overijssel
Railway stations opened in 1886
Rijssen-Holten